This is a list of Chinese national-type primary schools (SJK(C)) in Penang, Malaysia. As of June 2022, there are 90 Chinese primary schools with a total of 43,854 students.

List of Chinese national-type primary schools in Penang

Central Seberang Perai District 
As of June 2022, there are 16 Chinese primary schools with 10,463 students in Central Seberang Perai District.

Northeast Penang Island District 
As of June 2022, there are 37 Chinese primary schools with 16,809 students in Northeast Penang Island District.

North Seberang Perai District 
As of June 2022, there are 16 Chinese primary schools with 7,390 students in North Seberang Perai District.

Southwest Penang Island District 
As of June 2022, there are 14 Chinese primary schools with 3,900 students in Southwest Penang Island District.

South Seberang Perai District 
As of June 2022, there are 7 Chinese primary schools with 5,292 students in South Seberang Perai District.

See also 

 Lists of Chinese national-type primary schools in Malaysia

References

 
Schools in Penang
Panang
Chinese-language schools in Malaysia